In a school garden, school children are set to work cultivating flower and vegetable gardens. The school garden is an outgrowth of regular school work. It is an effort to get children out of doors and away from books. It is a healthy realism putting more vigor and intensity into school work.

History
The value of school gardens in education has long been recognized in Europe. They were started as early as 1819 in Schleswig-Holstein. In 1869 they were prescribed by law in Austria and Sweden, in Belgium since 1873 and in France since 1880. In the early 20th century, there were 20,000 schools in Austria having gardens, 45,000 in France, 8,000 in Russia and 2,500 in Sweden. The number in the latter country once was double the present number, but has decreased since the introduction of manual training. School gardening was practically obligatory for the children of the common schools of Belgium, Netherlands, British West Indies and Ceylon. Many of the foreign governments subsidized the school gardens, offered prizes, and made training in agriculture obligatory for normal school graduates.

School gardens have been advocated as an important aspect of manual training and of the whole subject of industrial education. It is a phase of manual training to teach children to use the tools and implements of the garden, to prepare the soil and carefully cultivate plants. It is an outdoor physical training combined with intelligent mental effort quite equal in its effects to shop work.

Some universities in the United States, like Cornell, Illinois, Ohio and Louisiana, have taken up the problem of school agriculture, country life and scientific farming in earnest. Pamphlets are published by experts of agriculture dealing with important phases of school agriculture and school gardens, in particular Jewell's Agricultural Education (Bulletin 368, U. S. Bureau of Education).

Curriculum role
The school-garden has an important relation to several school studies. First of these is nature study. There is no better way of bringing children into contact with plant life than by raising flowers and vegetables in the garden. The boys and girls get out of doors, prepare the soil, plant the seed, observe the growth of plants, cultivate them through the season, and finally observe the growth and ripening of the fruit. This whole cycle of growth and change is the most fundamental thing in plant study.

In the second place the garden has a very important place in the study of geography. In the home geography in the early grades classes of children are required to visit the gardens and study the processes of cultivation and marketing the products. These are fundamental lessons in geography. In this way gardening leads on to agriculture, scientific farming, and fruit raising. The garden naturally suggests farming, the raising of corn and other grains, the feeding of cattle, dairying and butter-making, fruit-culture, as of berries, stone-fruits, apples and pears. Scientific agriculture and fruit-raising are based on principles of careful selection of seed and of wise cultivation, of fertilizing and preserving soils, of grafting, pruning and caring for fruit trees and dealing with insect pests.

The school garden has an important relation to esthetics. Floriculture, landscape gardening, tree-planting and fruit-culture appeal to the sense of beauty. The whole yard and garden together need to be planted and laid out on principles of taste and attractiveness.

Perhaps the most important relation of the school garden is that to the home. Where boys and girls become properly interested in the school garden, they naturally desire to raise a garden at home in their own backyard and perhaps flowerbeds and trees in the front yard. This answers in many ways to the necessities and comforts of the home. The whole town may take on a new appearance, in its yards and gardens, on account of this interest developed in the school garden. Beauty and utility are combined; the home-table is supplied with vegetables and beautified by the flowers which the children themselves raise.

The educative effect upon the boy or girl of carrying out through the whole season plans for cultivating a garden is one of the best products of good training. The cultivation of plants requires constant attention, forethought, intelligence, self-reliance and a kind of originality; difficulties are to be met and overcome. Insects infest the plants and must be gotten rid of; chickens scratch up and spoil the garden and a fence is needed for protection; a dry spell calls for some plan of watering; weeds quickly take possession of a garden; and the child must be intelligent and thoughtful in meeting such difficulties. This is the best kind of training. To say the least, it is far better than letting the boy run wild on the streets and getting into all sorts of mischief.

Most of our progressive normal schools in all parts of the country are taking up the problem of school-gardens, not for the children simply but for the teachers. Young teachers are set to work to learn the whole problem, so that they may later guide the children in garden work. It is clear that the school-garden is to occupy an important place in the future education of boys and girls.

School gardens have existed for many years however, they are gaining in popularity in Canada.  School gardens can be linked to the curriculum in any grade through science, social studies, math, arts, language arts and more.  It helps students feel connected to place and is a great example of place-based learning.  Having students garden is experiential learning which can involve the whole school and larger community, through involving parents, community partners, and elders from the community.  It creates an opportunity for intergenerational learning, where people of different ages can come together to grow food and work towards a sustainable environment and community.

Through school gardens students learn to work the land and create a food garden in which they can grow food such as lettuce, potatoes, kale and peas.  Students learn about local food and what grows in their environment.  It helps to create a connection to food and get students thinking about where their food comes from and what it takes to grow it.  It supports better nutrition in students and can incorporate lessons on healthy eating.  This real world, hands-on learning has proven to be very popular with students and schools.  The schoolyard can be an extension of the classroom.  It connects students to the natural world and helps create responsible caretakers of the planet.  School gardens ultimately contribute to connections-between students, teachers, community, food, nature and sustainability.

See also
 List of garden types

References

External links
 

Primary education
Agricultural education
Types of garden